Civil Lines is a number of residential areas built during the British Raj, present in several towns and cities of Indian Subcontinent.

Civil Lines may also refer to:

 Civil Lines (magazine), a 1990s Indian magazine
 Civil Lines (Delhi Metro), a station of Delhi Metro rail
 Civil Lines metro station (Jaipur)

See also
 Civil Line, Karachi